Congenital dyserythropoietic anemia type IV (CDA IV) has been described with typical morphologic features of CDA II but a negative acidified-serum test.

Presentation
CDA type IV is characterized by mild to moderate splenomegaly. Hemoglobin is very low and patients are transfusion dependent. MCV is normal or mildly elevated. Erythropoiesis is normoblastic or mildly to moderately megaloblastic. Nonspecific erythroblast dysplasia is present.

Genetics
Congenital dyserythropoietic anemia type IV is an autosomal dominant inherited red blood cell disorder characterized by ineffective erythropoiesis and hemolysis resulting in anemia. Circulating erythroblasts and erythroblasts in the bone marrow show various morphologic abnormalities. Affected individuals with CDAN4 also have increased levels of fetal hemoglobin.

Diagnosis

Treatment
Treatment consists of frequent blood transfusions and chelation therapy. Potential cures include bone marrow transplantation and gene therapy.

See also
 Congenital dyserythropoietic anemia
 Thalassemia
 Hemoglobinopathy
 List of hematologic conditions

References

Further reading
 Congenital dyserythropoietic anemia at the US National Institutes of Health Home Genetic Reference]

External links 

Genetic disorders with no OMIM
Anemias